Pinguicula lueana is a perennial rosette-forming insectivorous plant native to the state of Oaxaca in Mexico. It is the only species of butterwort known to have a red flower. As Pinguicula lauana it has gained the Royal Horticultural Society's Award of Garden Merit.

References

laueana
Carnivorous plants of North America
Flora of Oaxaca